Nizhnyaya Bulanka is a rural locality (a selo) in the Karatuzsky District in Krasnoyarsk Krai, Russia. Population:

References

Rural localities in Krasnoyarsk Krai
Karatuzsky District